Abdoulkarim Goukoye (8 July 1964 – 8 November 2021) was a Nigerien militant and politician. He took part in the 2010 Nigerien coup d'état, which deposed President Mamadou Tandja. Following the coup's success, he became spokesperson for the Supreme Council for the Restoration of Democracy under Salou Djibo.

References

1964 births
2021 deaths
Nigerien politicians
People from Niamey